Monica Nielsen (born Monica Lindgren; 30 November 1937) is a Swedish actress and singer. She has appeared in more than 50 films and television shows since 1947.

Selected filmography
 Blue Sky (1955)
 The Girl in the Rain (1955)
 The Dance Hall (1955)
 The Song of the Scarlet Flower (1956)
 A Guest in His Own House (1957)
 Pirates on the Malonen (1959)
 The Cats (1965)
 The Princess (1966)
 The Man on the Balcony (1993)

References

External links

1937 births
Living people
20th-century Swedish actresses
21st-century Swedish actresses
Swedish film actresses
Swedish television actresses
Actresses from Stockholm
20th-century Swedish women singers